The George Capron House is a historic house located at 6 North Pleasant Street in Taunton, Massachusetts.

Description and history 
Constructed in 1888, the house is considered a fine example of a "builders Queen Anne" style house built for middle class residents during the late 19th century. The -story house has asymmetrical massing typical of the style, with projecting gabled sections and a decorative wraparound porch. The property includes a matching carriage house.

It was added to the National Register of Historic Places on July 5, 1984.

See also
National Register of Historic Places listings in Taunton, Massachusetts

References

National Register of Historic Places in Taunton, Massachusetts
Houses in Taunton, Massachusetts
Houses on the National Register of Historic Places in Bristol County, Massachusetts

Queen Anne architecture in Massachusetts
Houses completed in 1888